Rune Lorentsen (born 8 October 1961 in Tromsø, Norway) is a Norwegian wheelchair curler. He won a silver medal at the 2018 Winter Paralympics.

Life 
He started wheelchair curling in 2004. He was the skip when Norway won the gold at the World Championships in 2007, 2008, and 2017.

Lorentsen has a table tennis team gold from the European Championship in 1999, and bronze in 1997.

References

External links

Profile at the Official Website for the 2010 Winter Paralympics in Vancouver

1961 births
Living people
Norwegian male curlers
Norwegian wheelchair curlers
Paralympic wheelchair curlers of Norway
Paralympic medalists in wheelchair curling
Paralympic silver medalists for Norway
Wheelchair curlers at the 2010 Winter Paralympics
Wheelchair curlers at the 2014 Winter Paralympics
Wheelchair curlers at the 2018 Winter Paralympics
Medalists at the 2018 Winter Paralympics
World wheelchair curling champions
Place of birth missing (living people)
Sportspeople from Tromsø
21st-century Norwegian people